James Boswell, 9th Laird of Auchinleck (29 October 1740 (N.S.) – 19 May 1795), was a Scottish biographer, diarist, and lawyer, born in Edinburgh. He is best known for his biography of his friend and older contemporary the English writer Samuel Johnson, which is commonly said to be the greatest biography written in the English language. A great mass of Boswell's diaries, letters and private papers were recovered from the 1920s to the 1950s, and their ongoing publication by Yale University has transformed his reputation.

Early life
Boswell was born in Blair's Land on the east side of Parliament Close behind St Giles' Cathedral in Edinburgh on 29 October 1740 (N.S.). He was the eldest son of a judge, Alexander Boswell, Lord Auchinleck, and his wife Euphemia Erskine. As the eldest son, he was heir to his family's estate of Auchinleck in Ayrshire. Boswell's mother was a strict Calvinist, and he felt that his father was cold to him. As a child, he was delicate. Kay Jamison, Professor of Psychiatry at Johns Hopkins, in her book Touched with Fire, believes that Boswell may have suffered from bipolar disorder, and this condition would afflict him sporadically all through his life. At the age of five, he was sent to James Mundell's academy, an advanced institution by the standards of the time, where he was instructed in English, Latin, writing and arithmetic.

The eight-year-old Boswell was unhappy there, and suffered from nightmares and extreme shyness. Consequently, he was removed from the academy and educated by a string of private tutors. The most notable and supportive of these, John Dunn, exposed Boswell to modern literature, such as The Spectator essays, and religion. Dunn was also present during Boswell's serious affliction of 1752, when he was confined to the town of Moffat in northern Dumfriesshire. This afforded Boswell his first experience of genuine society. His recovery was rapid and complete, and Boswell may have decided that travel and entertainment exerted a calming therapeutic effect on him.

At thirteen, Boswell was enrolled into the arts course at the University of Edinburgh, studying there from 1753 to 1758. Midway through his studies, he suffered an episode of serious depression but recovered fully. Boswell had swarthy skin, black hair and dark eyes; he was of average height, and he tended to plumpness. His appearance was said to be alert and masculine.

Upon turning nineteen, he was sent to continue his studies at the University of Glasgow, where he attended the lectures of Adam Smith. While at Glasgow, Boswell decided to convert to Catholicism and become a monk. Upon learning of this, his father ordered him home. Instead of obeying, though, Boswell ran away to London, where he spent three months, living the life of a libertine, before he was taken back to Scotland by his father. Upon returning, he was re-enrolled at Edinburgh University and forced by his father to sign away most of his inheritance in return for an allowance of £100 a year.

On 30 July 1762, Boswell passed his oral law exam, after which his father decided to raise his allowance to £200 a year and permitted him to return to London. In this period, Boswell wrote his London Journal and, on 16 May 1763, met Johnson for the first time. The pair became friends almost immediately, though Johnson became more of a parental figure in Boswell's eyes. Johnson eventually nicknamed him "Bozzy".

The first conversation between Johnson and Boswell is quoted in Life of Samuel Johnson as follows:

[Boswell:] "Mr Johnson, I do indeed come from Scotland, but I cannot help it."
[Johnson:] "That, Sir, I find, is what a very great many of your countrymen cannot help."

European travels 

It was around three months after this first encounter with Johnson that Boswell departed for Europe with the initial goal of continuing his law studies at Utrecht University. He spent a year there and although desperately unhappy the first few months, eventually quite enjoyed his time in Utrecht. He befriended and fell in love with Isabelle de Charrière, also known as Belle van Zuylen, a vivacious young Dutchwoman of unorthodox opinions, his social and intellectual superior. Boswell admired the young widow Geelvinck who refused to marry him. After this, Boswell spent most of the next two years travelling around the continent, his Grand Tour. During this time he met Jean-Jacques Rousseau and Voltaire with a recommendation letter of Constant d'Hermenches, and made a pilgrimage to Rome, where his portrait was painted by George Willison. Boswell also travelled to Corsica to meet one of his heroes, the independence leader Pasquale Paoli. His well-observed diaries and correspondence of this time have been compiled into two books, Boswell in Holland and Boswell on the Grand Tour.

Mature life

Boswell returned to London in February 1766 accompanied by Rousseau's mistress, with whom he had a brief affair on the journey home.<ref>Correspondence of James Boswell and William Johnson Temple, Edinburgh 1997, page 140 footnote 4 </ref> After spending a few weeks in the capital, he returned to Scotland, buying (or perhaps renting) the former house of David Hume on James Court on the Lawnmarket. He studied for his final law exam at Edinburgh University. He passed the exam and became an advocate. He practised for over a decade, during which time he spent no more than a month every year with Johnson. Nevertheless, he returned to London annually to mingle with Johnson and the rest of the London literary crowd, and to escape his mundane existence in Scotland. He found enjoyment in playing the intellectual rhyming game crambo with his peers.

Some of his journal entries and letters from this period describe his amatory exploits. Thus, in 1767, in a letter to William Johnson Temple, he wrote, "I got myself quite intoxicated, went to a Bawdy-house and past a whole night in the arms of a Whore. She indeed was a fine strong spirited Girl, a Whore worthy of Boswell if Boswell must have a whore." A few years earlier, he wrote that during a night with an actress named Louisa, "five times was I fairly lost in supreme rapture. Louisa was madly fond of me; she declared I was a prodigy and asked me if this was not extraordinary for human nature." Though he sometimes used a condom for protection, he contracted venereal disease at least seventeen times.

Boswell was a major supporter of the Corsican Republic. Following the island's invasion by France in 1768, Boswell attempted to raise public awareness and rally support for the Corsicans. He sent arms and money to the Corsican fighters, who were ultimately defeated at the Battle of Ponte Novu in 1769. Boswell attended the masquerade held at the Shakespeare Jubilee in Stratford-upon-Avon in September 1769 dressed as a Corsican Chief. He was also, much to the chagrin of his friend Johnson, a strong defender of the American Revolution.

Boswell married his cousin, Margaret Montgomerie, on 25 November 1769. She remained faithful to Boswell, despite his frequent liaisons with prostitutes, until her death from tuberculosis in 1789. After his infidelities, he would deliver tearful apologies to her and beg her forgiveness, before again promising her, and himself, that he would reform. James and Margaret had four sons and three daughters. Two sons died in infancy; the other two were Alexander (1775–1822) and James (1778–1822). Their daughters were Veronica (1773–1795), Euphemia (1774 – c. 1834) and Elizabeth, known as 'Betsy', (1780–1814). Boswell also had at least two extramarital children, Charles (1762–1764) and Sally (1767 – c. 1768).

Despite his relative literary success with accounts of his European travels, Boswell was only a moderately successful advocate, with the exception of the copyright infringement case of Donaldson v Beckett, where Boswell represented the Scottish bookseller Alexander Donaldson. By the late 1770s, Boswell descended further and further into alcoholism and gambling addiction. Throughout his life, from childhood until death, he was beset by severe swings of mood. His depressions frequently encouraged and were exacerbated by his various vices. His happier periods usually saw him relatively vice-free. His character mixed a superficial Enlightenment sensibility for reason and taste with a genuine and somewhat romantic love of the sublime and a propensity for occasionally puerile whimsy. The latter, along with his tendency for drink and other vices, caused many contemporaries and later observers to regard him as being too lightweight to be an equal in the literary crowd that he wanted to be a part of. However, his humour and innocent good nature won him many lifelong friends.

In 1773 Boswell bought the house of David Hume (who moved to a new house on South St David Street/St Andrew Square) on the south east corner of James Court.Edinburgh and District: Ward Lock Travel Guide 1930 He lived there until 1786. Boswell's residency at James Court has been well established, but not the exact location.  For example, a later edition of Traditions of Edinburgh by Robert Chambers suggests that Boswell's residence at James Court was actually in the Western wing.  His James Court flat was notable for having two levels, and although a modern renovation in the Eastern section reveals such a possibility, it is likely that Boswell's residence was a similarly equipped one in the Western section that no longer exists, having burned down in the mid 1800s.

Earl of Dumfries

Boswell became quite friendly with the 6th Earl of Dumfries, as well as seeing him in Scotland he also visited him in Rosemount, London in 1787 and 1788.
In Boswell's of November 2, 1778 journal he writes, “[The Earl of Dumfries] was exceedingly attentive to me [...] I was upon my guard, as I well knew that he and his Countess flattered themselves that they would get from me that road through our estate which my father had refused, and which in truth I was still more positive for refusing [etc.]” - He saw the Earl as “very attentive”.

Having hosted the Earl, Boswell and his wife also decide to visit Dumfries House “[o]ur visit was a little awkward, as there had been no communication between the families for several of the last years of my father’s life [...] I, however, wished to live on civil terms with such near neighbours [etc.]”.On October 27, 1782, Boswell writes “we looked at Lord Dumfries’s gate and the famous road. [...] I showed him that granting it would make the Auchinleck improvements appear part of the Earl of Dumfries’s domains. [...] If Lord Eglinton - if my Earl - were Earl of Dumfries and living at Dumfries House, he should have the road, but not to him and his heirs. [etc.]”.Later life
Boswell was a frequent guest of Lord Monboddo at Monboddo House, a setting where he gathered significant observations for his writings by association with Samuel Johnson, Lord Kames and other notable attendees.

After Johnson's death in 1784, Boswell moved to London to try his luck at the English Bar, which proved even less successful than his career in Scotland. In 1792 Boswell lobbied the Home Secretary to help gain royal pardons for four Botany Bay escapees, including Mary Bryant. He also offered to stand for Parliament but failed to get the necessary support, and he spent the final years of his life writing his Life of Samuel Johnson. 

During this time his health began to fail due to venereal disease and his years of drinking. Boswell died in London in 1795. Close to the end of his life he became strongly convinced that the "Shakespeare papers", including two previously unknown plays Vortigern and Rowena and Henry II, allegedly discovered by William Henry Ireland, were genuine. After Boswell's death they proved to be forgeries created by Ireland himself. Boswell's remains were interred in the crypt of the Boswell family mausoleum in what is now the old Auchinleck Kirkyard in Ayrshire. The mausoleum is attached to the old Auchinleck Kirk.

 Life of Samuel Johnson 

When the Life of Samuel Johnson was published in 1791, its style was unique in that, unlike other biographies of that era, it directly incorporated conversations that Boswell had noted down at the time for his journals. He also included more personal and human details than those to which contemporary readers were accustomed. Instead of writing a strictly fact-based record of Johnson's public life in the style of the time, he painted a more personal and intimate portrait of the man than was normal in biographies of the day.

Macaulay and Carlyle, among others, have attempted to explain how a man such as Boswell could have produced a work as detailed as the Life of Johnson. The former argued that Boswell's uninhibited folly and candour were his greatest qualifications; the latter replied that beneath such traits was a mind to discern excellence and a heart to appreciate it, aided by the power of accurate observation and considerable dramatic ability.

 As an abolitionist 
Boswell was present at the meeting of the Committee for the Abolition of the Slave Trade in May 1787 set up to persuade William Wilberforce to lead the abolition movement in Parliament. However, the abolitionist Thomas Clarkson records that by 1788 Boswell "after having supported the cause ... became inimical to it".
Boswell's most prominent display of support for slavery was his 1791 poem "No Abolition of Slavery; or the Universal Empire of Love", which lampooned Clarkson, Wilberforce and Pitt. The poem also supports the common suggestion of the pro-slavery movement, that the slaves actually enjoyed their lot: "The cheerful gang! – the negroes see / Perform the task of industry."

Discovery of papers
In the 1920s a great part of Boswell's private papers, including intimate journals for much of his life, were discovered at Malahide Castle, north of Dublin. These provide a hugely revealing insight into the life and thoughts of the man. They were sold to the American collector Ralph H. Isham and have since passed to Yale University, which has published popular and scholarly editions of his journals and correspondence. A second cache was discovered soon after and also purchased by Isham. A substantially longer edition of The Journal of a Tour to the Hebrides was published in 1936 based on his original manuscript, edited by L. F. Powell. His London Journal 1762–63, the first of the Yale journal publications, appeared in 1950. The last popular edition, The Great Biographer, 1789–1795, was published in 1989. Publication of the research edition of Boswell's journals and letters, each including never before published material, was ceased by Yale University in June 2021, prior to the completion of the project.

These detailed and frank journals include voluminous notes on the Grand Tour of Europe that he took as a young man and, subsequently, of his tour of Scotland with Johnson. His journals also record meetings and conversations with eminent individuals belonging to The Club, including Lord Monboddo, David Garrick, Edmund Burke, Joshua Reynolds and Oliver Goldsmith.

It is since the discovery of these journals that Boswell has become recognized as a major literary artist. In his openness to every nuance of feeling, his delicacy in capturing fugitive sentiments and revealing gestures, his comic self-regard and (at times) self-contempt, Boswell was willing to express what other authors of the time repressed.

Freemasonry
Boswell was initiated into Freemasonry in Lodge Canongate Kilwinning on 14 August 1759. He subsequently became Master of that Lodge in 1773 and in that year was Senior Grand Warden of the Grand Lodge of Scotland. From 1776 to 1777 he was the Depute Grand Master of that Grand Lodge.

 In fiction and popular culture 

Boswell's surname has passed into the English language as a term (Boswell, Boswellian, Boswellism) for a constant companion and observer, especially one who records those observations in print. In "A Scandal in Bohemia", Sir Arthur Conan Doyle's character Sherlock Holmes affectionately says of Dr. Watson, who narrates the tales, "I am lost without my Boswell."

The comedy Young Auchinleck (1962) by Scottish playwright Robert McLellan depicts Boswell's various courtships and troubled relations with his father in the period after his return to Scotland in 1766, culminating in his eventual marriage to his cousin Margaret Montgomery (Peggy) in 1769 on the same day as his father's second marriage in a different part of the country. The play was first produced at the Edinburgh International Festival in 1962 and adapted for BBC Television in 1965.

In 1981 the cartoonist R. Crumb published the piece "Boswell's London Journal" in the anthology magazine Weirdo. Presented as a "Klassic Komic," the piece featured meticulous cross-hatched illustrations and excerpts from Boswell's writing to tell a satirical story of the young Boswell attempting to establish himself in London society, dallying with prostitutes and suffering from venereal disease.

Boswell was played by John Sessions in Boswell & Johnson's Tour of the Western Isles, a 1993 BBC 2 play.

In February and March 2015, BBC Radio 4 broadcast three episodes of "Boswell's Lives", writer Jon Canter's comedic take on Boswell meeting later historical figures (Sigmund Freud, Maria Callas and Harold Pinter, respectively) for the purposes of biographing them. Boswell was played by Miles Jupp.

American novelist Philip Baruth wrote a fictional account of James Boswell's early life in The Brothers Boswell (Soho Press 2009). The novel, which includes scenes that feature Samuel Johnson, is a thriller that focuses on the tense relationship between James and his younger brother John. Boswell also features as a character in James Robertson's novel, Joseph Knight (2003).

On 14 November 2020, New York Times columnist Maureen Dowd called reporter Maggie Haberman "Trump's Boswell", referring to Ms. Haberman's tenacious and in-depth reporting of Donald Trump's presidential years.

 Major works 
 The Cub at Newmarket (1762, published by James Dodsley)
 Letters Between the Honourable Andrew Erskine, and James Boswell, Esq. (1763)
 Dorando, a Spanish Tale (1767, anonymously)
 Account of Corsica, The Journal of a Tour to That Island, and Memoirs of Pascal Paoli (1768) 
 "The Rampager" (1770–82, a series of 20 essays published sporadically in the Public Advertiser)
 The Hypochondriack (1777–83, a series of 70 essays published monthly in the London Magazine)
 The Journal of a Tour to the Hebrides with Samuel Johnson, LL.D (1785)
 The Life of Samuel Johnson, LL.D 2 vols. (1791, reprinted in Everyman's Library)
 No Abolition of Slavery (1791) (poem)

Published journals 
After Boswell's private papers were recovered, and brought together by Ralph Isham, they were acquired by Yale University, where a dedicated office was established to edit and publish his journals and correspondence. The journals have been published in 13 volumes, as follows.

Boswell's London Journal, 1762–1763, ed. F. A. Pottle (1950)
Boswell in Holland, 1763–1764, including his correspondence with Belle de Zuylen (Zelide), ed. F. A. Pottle (1952)
Boswell on the Grand Tour: Germany and Switzerland, 1764, ed. F. A. Pottle (1953)
Boswell on the Grand Tour: Italy, Corsica, and France, 1765–1766, ed. Frank Brady and F. A. Pottle (1955)
Boswell in Search of a Wife, 1766–1769, ed. Frank Brady and F. A. Pottle (1957)
Boswell for the Defence, 1769–1774, ed. W. A. Wimsatt and F. A. Pottle (1960)
Boswell: the Ominous Years, 1774–1776, ed. Charles Ryskamp and F. A. Pottle (1963)
Boswell in Extremes, 1776–1778, ed. C. McC. Weis and F. A. Pottle (1970)
Boswell, Laird of Auchinleck, 1778–1782, ed. J. W. Reed and F. A. Pottle (1977)
Boswell: The Applause of the Jury, 1782–1785, ed. I. S. Lustig and F. A. Pottle (1981)
Boswell: The English Experiment, 1785–1789, ed. I. S. Lustig and F. A. Pottle (1986)
Boswell: The Great Biographer, 1789–1795, ed. Marlies K. Danziger and Frank Brady (1989)

References
Notes

Sources
 Pierce, Patricia. The Great Shakespeare Fraud: The Strange, True Story of William-Henry Ireland. Sutton Publishing, 2005.

Further reading
 Boswell, James. Boswell's Book of Bad Verse (A Verse Self-Portrait) or 'Love Poems and Other Verses by James Boswell'''. Edited with Notes by Jack Werner. London. White Lion, 1974. .
 Boswell, James. Boswell's Column. Being his Seventy Contributions to The London Magazine under the pseudonym The Hypochondriack from 1777 to 1783 here First Printed in Book Form in England. Introduction and Notes by Margery Bailey. London. William Kimber, 1951.
 Boswell, James. Facts and Inventions: Selections from the Journalism of James Boswell. Edited by Paul Tankard. New Haven. Yale University Press, 2014. 
 Boswell, James. The Journal of a Tour to Corsica; and Memoirs of Pascal Paoli. Edited, with an Introduction, by Morchard Bishop. London. Williams & Norgate, 1951.
 Boswell, James. Letters of James Boswell to the Rev. W. J. Temple. Introduction by Thomas Seccombe. London. Sidgwick & Jackson, 1908.
 William C. Dowling. The Boswellian Hero. Athens, Georgia: University of Georgia Press, 1979. .
 Finlayson, Iain. The Moth and the Candle. A Life of James Boswell. London. Constable, 1984. .
 Maurice Lévy : James Boswell. Un libertin mélancolique, Grenoble, éd. Ellug, 2001, 412 pages.
 McLaren, Moray: The Highland Jaunt. A Study of James Boswell and Samuel Johnson upon their Highland and Hebridean Tour of 1773. London. Jarrolds, 1954.
 Mallory, George. Boswell the Biographer. London. Smith, Elder, 1912.
 Martin, Peter. "A Life of James Boswell". London. Weidenfeld & Nicolson, 1999.
 Pottle, Frederick A. Boswell and the Girl from Botany Bay. London. Heinemann, 1938.
 Tinker, Chauncey g Brewster. Young Boswell. Chapters on James Boswell the Biographer Based Largely on New Material. Boston. Atlantic Monthly, 1922.
 Uglow, Jenny, "Big Talkers" (review of Leo Damrosch, The Club:  Johnson, Boswell, and the Friends Who Shaped an Age, Yale University Press, 473 pp.), The New York Review of Books, vol. LXVI, no. 9 (23 May 2019), pp. 26–28.
 Wyndham Lewis, D.B. The Hooded Hawk or The Case of Mr. Boswell''. London. Eyre & Spottiswoode, 1946.

External links 

 James Boswell at the Eighteenth-Century Poetry Archive (ECPA)
 
 
 
 Essay on Johnson, Boswell and the Abolition of Slavery
 Blog on Boswell's London Journal
 Online catalogue (in progress) of James Boswell's library at LibraryThing
 James Boswell – a Guide
 James Boswell's "An Account of Corsica" – Full text and illustrations
 Young Boswell, by Chauncey Brewster Tinker, Boston: Atlantic monthly press, 1922, University of Michigan Library (Digital Collection)
 Boswell Book Festival celebrates the art of biography and memoir at Boswell's home, Auchinleck House, in Ayrshire, Scotland
 
 
 Portraits of James Boswell and Dr. Johnson at the Scottish National Portrait Gallery

 
1740 births
1795 deaths
Alumni of the University of Edinburgh
Alumni of the University of Glasgow
People from East Ayrshire
Writers from Edinburgh
Samuel Johnson
People educated at James Mundell's School
18th-century biographers
18th-century Scottish writers
Proslavery activists
Scottish Freemasons
18th-century diarists
Conversationalists
Streathamites